From roughly 1860 to 1920 painted photography backdrops were a standard feature of early photography studios.  Generally of rustic or quasi-classical design, but sometimes presenting a bourgeoisie trompe-l'œil, they eventually fell out of fashion with the advent of the Brownie and Kodak cameras which brought photography to the masses with concurrent changes to public sensibility.   Inasmuch as they were produced for six decades by local artisans, they can provide important clues to the provenance of old family photographs for genealogical research, and their staged influence lives on in "old-timey" photography sets. Furthermore, they are of some interest to specialized collectors of the history of photography.

Gallery

References

External links

Reference work
Genealogical research
Collecting

Photographic techniques